Charlotte Parish was created as a civil parish in Queens County, Prince Edward Island, Canada, during the 1764–1766 survey of Samuel Holland.

It contains the following townships:

 Lot 24
 Lot 32
 Lot 33
 Lot 34

It also contains Queens Royalty.

Parishes of Prince Edward Island
Geography of Queens County, Prince Edward Island